Ctenogobius is a genus of gobies with a wide distribution in fresh, brackish and marine waters.

Species
There are currently 22 recognized species in this genus:
 Ctenogobius aestivaregia (T. Mori, 1934)
 Ctenogobius boleosoma (D. S. Jordan & C. H. Gilbert, 1882) (Darter goby)
 Ctenogobius cervicosquamus H. L. Wu, Lu & Y. Ni, 1986
 Ctenogobius chengtuensis (H. W. Chang, 1944)
 Ctenogobius clarki Evermann & T. H. Shaw, 1927
 Ctenogobius claytonii (Meek, 1902) (Mexican goby)
 Ctenogobius fasciatus T. N. Gill, 1858 (Blotchcheek goby)
 Ctenogobius fukushimai (T. Mori, 1934)
 Ctenogobius lepturus (Pfaff, 1933)
 Ctenogobius manglicola (D. S. Jordan & Starks, 1895)
 Ctenogobius phenacus (Pezold & Lasala S., 1987) (Impostor goby)
 Ctenogobius pseudofasciatus (C. R. Gilbert & J. E. Randall, 1971) (Slashcheek goby)
 Ctenogobius saepepallens (C. R. Gilbert & J. E. Randall, 1968) (Dash goby)
 Ctenogobius sagittula (Günther, 1862) (Longtail goby)
 Ctenogobius shennongensis G. R. Yang & C. X. Xie, 1983
 Ctenogobius shufeldti (D. S. Jordan & C. H. Eigenmann, 1887) (American freshwater goby)
 Ctenogobius smaragdus (Valenciennes, 1837) (Emerald goby)
 Ctenogobius stigmaticus (Poey, 1860) (Marked goby)
 Ctenogobius stigmaturus (Goode & T. H. Bean, 1882) (Spottail goby)
 Ctenogobius szechuanensis (C. K. Liu, 1940)
 Ctenogobius thoropsis (Pezold & C. R. Gilbert, 1987) (Sperm goby)
 Ctenogobius vexillifer Fowler, 1937

References

Gobionellinae
Taxa named by Theodore Gill